West Elk Peak, elevation , is the highest summit in the West Elk Mountains of Gunnison County, Colorado. The mountain is in the West Elk Wilderness, northwest of Gunnison. The terrain consists mostly of volcanic breccia, known in this area as West Elk Breccia, dated at 35 to 30 million years old.

Geological History - The decipherable known geological history of this peak began in the late Paleozoic, where it formed into the eastern edge of the Uncompahgre highland. Around 10,000 to 15,000 feet of sediment covered the old highland surface in the Mesozoic and early Cenozoic. During the Oligocene, the Colorado mineral belt began to form with the intrusion of two batholiths. One of these batholiths rose sufficiently near the surface, enough to feed volcanoes in the West Elk and San Juan Mountains. The resulting volcanic pile has been subjected to intermittent, occasional uplift as well as being shaped by water and ice. Mineral deposits are somewhat scarce in the surrounding area of the peak, but bituminous coal has been mined on the northern and eastern flanks.

Historical names
West Elk Mountain
West Elk Peak

See also

List of Colorado mountain ranges
List of Colorado mountain summits
List of Colorado fourteeners
List of Colorado 4000 meter prominent summits
List of the most prominent summits of Colorado
List of Colorado county high points

References

External links

West Elk Mountains
Mountains of Gunnison County, Colorado
Mountains of Colorado
North American 3000 m summits